Bangors is a village in northeast Cornwall, England, United Kingdom. It is approximately four miles (6 km) south of Bude on the A39 trunk road, within the civil parish of Poundstock.

References

Villages in Cornwall